The Last Lieutenant is a 1993 Norwegian film, directed by Hans Petter Moland and starring Espen Skjønberg. It was released in the USA with English subtitles.

Plot

The old sea-captain retires, but the next day German World War II occupation of Norway begins. He then kisses his wife good-bye and is off to Regiment HQ. There he finds a lack of leadership and morale that offends him. They even laugh at him and his out-dated uniform and discontinued second lieutenant officer-rank, that he had earned years before. He is sent with a few men to blow up a bridge. The young men laugh at him and generally ignore his advice. When the bridge fails to collapse, he does the job himself. He returns to HQ to find that its officers have voted to surrender. He leaves the HQ with a few men, taking trucks and supplies to continue the fight, often at odds with the remainder of army leadership. He rebuilds a small fighting unit with volunteers and draftees and he achieves some battlefield success. Eventually his men abandon him, and he faces a German attack alone.

Historical context
The film is set during the early part of World War 2, and specifically around Operation Weserübung, the invasion of Norway and Denmark by Germany, beginning on 9 April 1940.

This film is based, somewhat loosely, on the actions of 2nd Lt. Thor O. Hannevig, Norwegian Army (Reserve). He was a retired sea Captain who rejoined the Norwegian Army and fought with a force of 150 mostly reserve soldiers as the Telemark Infantry Regiment after his original regiment surrendered on 9 April 1940. The ad hoc regiment operated from 21 April 1940, around the town of Vinje in Telemark County, until 3 May when the regiment became aware that the 4th Division had also capitulated, dashing any hope of relief forces. Most of his men were discharged from service at this time and left the area in civilian clothing. On 8 May, Hannevig and the remaining three soldiers and six female auxiliaries of the regiment were taken as prisoners of war and the 28 German POWs Hannevig's force had captured were freed.

Key differences between the actual events and those depicted in the film are the age of Lt. Hannevig, that he disbanded his unit instead of being abandoned by his soldiers, and a small staff remained with him until he surrendered to the Germans. In addition, the German POWs his regiment had captured were still held, and were handed over to the German forces directly.

References

External links
 
 

1993 films
Norwegian war drama films
1990s Norwegian-language films
World War II films based on actual events
Western Front of World War II films
Films directed by Hans Petter Moland